The 2020–21 Montenegrin Cup was the 15th season of the knockout football tournament in Montenegro. This season's cup began on 21 October 2020. The winners of the cup this season earned a place in the first qualifying round of a new competition, the 2021–22 UEFA Europa Conference League.

The previous season's cup was abandoned due to the COVID-19 pandemic in Montenegro.

First round
Draw for the first round was held on 15 October 2020. Eight first round matches were played on 21 October 2020.

Summary

|}

Matches

Quarter-finals
Draw for the quarter-finals was held on 16 November 2020. Four quarter-final matches were played on 25 November 2020.

Summary

|}

Matches

Semi-finals
Draw for the semi-finals was held on 12 April 2021. The semi-finals were played from 21 April to 5 May 2021.

Summary

|}

First legs

Second legs

Final

See also
 Montenegrin Cup
 Montenegrin First League

References

External links
Montenegrin Cup 2020-2021 at Football Association of Montenegro's official site
Montenegrin Cup 2020-2021 at Soccerway

Montenegrin Cup seasons
Montenegro
Cup